The Lair of the Wolf is a 1917 American silent drama film directed by Charles Swickard and starring Donna Drew, Gretchen Lederer and Joseph W. Girard.

Cast
 Donna Drew as Steve Taylor
 Gretchen Lederer as Margaret Dennis
 Joseph W. Girard as Oliver Cathcart 
 Chester Bennett as Jim Dennis
 Val Paul as Raymond Taylor
 Charles Hill Mailes as Robert Shepherd 
 Peggy Custer as Bess Shepherd
 George Berrell as Old Man Taylor

References

Bibliography
 Robert B. Connelly. The Silents: Silent Feature Films, 1910-36, Volume 40, Issue 2. December Press, 1998.

External links
 

1917 films
1917 drama films
1910s English-language films
American silent feature films
Silent American drama films
American black-and-white films
Universal Pictures films
Films directed by Charles Swickard
1910s American films